William Orchard (fl. 1468died 1504) was an English gothic architect, responsible for the elaborate pendant vaults of the Divinity School, Oxford and the chancel of Christ Church Cathedral, Oxford. He worked on the cloister and designed the Great Tower of Magdalen College, Oxford also known as Magdalen Tower. He also designed the parish church of Waterstock. He lived at Barton, a hamlet of Headington, where he owned a Quarry.

Gallery of architectural work

References

Gothic architects
15th-century English architects
Year of birth missing
15th-century births
1504 deaths
16th-century English architects
Architects from Oxford